John Baker White (August 4, 1794 – October 9, 1862) was a 19th-century American military officer, lawyer, court clerk, and civil servant in the U.S. state of Virginia.

During the War of 1812, White enlisted in the United States Army as a soldier and was promoted to the military rank of ensign. In 1815, White was qualified as Clerk of Court for both the county and circuit courts of Hampshire County, Virginia (now West Virginia) and he continued to hold these offices through successive appointments and elections for 46 years between 1815 and 1861. To date, White remains the longest-serving Clerk of Court for Hampshire County since the office's creation in 1757. As a prominent lawyer and court clerk, White taught jurisprudence. Many of White's law students later became eminent lawyers and public officials in their own right, including Henry Bedinger, United States House Representative and United States Ambassador to Denmark.

During the American Civil War, White was concerned for the safety of the county's records and proceeded to load land registration records ledger books onto wagons and had them transported for safekeeping. Because of White's efforts, Hampshire County land records survived the war, while those records that remained in the courthouse were destroyed. White was threatened by occupying Union Army forces to either vacate his residence in Romney or face arrest because of his Confederate sympathies. White relocated to Richmond and served in the Confederate States Department of the Treasury.

White was a member of the White political family of Virginia and West Virginia and was the son of prominent Virginia judge Robert White (1759–1831) and the father of West Virginia Attorney General Robert White (1833–1915) and Hampshire County Clerk of Court Christian Streit White (1839–1917).

Early life and military career
John Baker White was born on August 4, 1794, near Winchester in Frederick County, Virginia. White was the third and youngest child of prominent Virginia General Court judge Robert White (1759–1831) and his wife Arabella Baker (daughter of John Baker). Among his other relations, White was a great-great-nephew of United States House Representative Alexander White (1738–1804) and a great-nephew of another United States House Representative, Francis White (1761–1826).

During the War of 1812, White enlisted in the United States Army as a soldier and was promoted to the military rank of ensign.

Clerk of court career
Following his service in the War of 1812, White settled in Romney, Virginia (now West Virginia) where he was appointed as deputy clerk for both the superior court and circuit court in Hampshire County in 1814. On March 20, 1815, White was qualified as Clerk of Court for both the superior and circuit courts of Hampshire County, and he continued to hold these offices through successive appointments and elections for 46 years between 1815 and 1861. To date, White remains the longest-serving Clerk of Court for Hampshire County since the office's creation in 1757.

Academic affairs
As a prominent lawyer and court clerk, White conducted the teaching of jurisprudence in both his Clerk of Court office and residence, where he allowed his law students to reside during their studies. Many of White's law students later became eminent lawyers and public officials in their own right, including: Henry Bedinger, United States House Representative and United States Ambassador to Denmark; James Dillon Armstrong, Hampshire County Circuit Court judge and son of William Armstrong; Dr. Robert White, Presbyterian minister of Tuscaloosa, Alabama; and Virginia lawyers Newton Tapscott, Alfred P. White, and Philip B. Streit.

In addition to his law instruction, White was an active member of the Romney Literary Society. When the act of incorporation for Romney Academy was amended by the Virginia General Assembly on March 25, 1839, White was appointed as a trustee along with other prominent Romney area residents David Gibson, Angus William McDonald, Daniel Mytinger, and John Kern, Jr. The 1839 act authorized any of the five appointed trustees of Romney Academy to fill vacancies on the board "occasioned by death, resignation, removal, or legal disability", thereby preventing future prolonged vacant trustee seats.

Business affairs
By 1839, White was serving on the board of directors of the Bank of the Valley of Virginia in Romney. During the absence of the board's president, David Gibson, White served as president pro tempore from November 29 until December 13, 1839. The Wirgman Building housed the Bank of the Valley of Virginia during White's tenure on its board of directors.

American Civil War
Prior to the outbreak of the American Civil War, White was in support of preserving the United States. In the United States presidential election of 1860, White supported Constitutional Union Party presidential candidate John Bell and his running mate Edward Everett. The Constitutional Union Party was formed by former Whig Party members seeking to avoid secessionism over the issue of slavery. In 1861, White voted for Union candidates to serve as delegates from Hampshire County in the Virginia secession convention, one of which was his son-in-law Colonel E. M. Armstrong.

White's national loyalties shifted following the Battle of Fort Sumter and other Union encroachments into the Confederate States of America, after which White supported the defense of Virginia's states' rights and of the United States Constitution. White's eldest three sons out of four joined the Confederate States Army, and White became active in enlisting and arousing support within Hampshire County for the Confederate States cause. Because of his Confederate sympathies, White was threatened by occupying Union Army forces to either vacate his residence in Romney or face arrest.

Preservation of Hampshire County records 
No court proceedings convened in the county between 1861 and 1864, and the Hampshire County Courthouse was utilized as a stable by Union soldiers stationed in Romney during the war. In 1861, Union Army forces under the command of Lew Wallace occupied Romney following a minor battle there during which White "kept close watch over" the county's record books so that they would not be destroyed by Union forces. Later in the fall of 1861, Union Army forces under the command of Benjamin Franklin Kelley advanced upon Romney.

Upon learning of this, White was again concerned for the safety of the county's records and proceeded to load land registration records ledger books onto wagons and had them transported to Winchester for safekeeping. White selected for transport only the bound volumes of records which included "deed books, wills, and settlements of estates" and kept the unbound paper records in the courthouse, thus separating them so that the entirety of the county's records could not be destroyed by Union forces. White likely chose to transport the bound volumes of records, as the loose paper records would have been more cumbersome to keep together.

In 1863, when Winchester was no longer a safe location for the storage of Hampshire County's records and they again risked destruction by Union Army forces, White's son Captain Christian Streit White took responsibility for the records and transferred them to Front Royal. When Front Royal became endangered by advancing Union Army forces, Captain White had the records moved to Luray Caverns where they remained for several months. In the fall of 1864, the county's record books were rescued by Captain White and his company as Union Army troops were in the process of destroying them. Captain White's company loaded about 150 record books into a wagon, and they were taken to North Carolina where they remained safely for the duration of the war. Hampshire County's land records survived and were returned to the courthouse following the conclusion of the American Civil War, likely by a soldier returning to the area from North Carolina. Had White not separated the records and sent the bound volumes away for safekeeping, Hampshire County would have lost all its records during the course of the war, as those that remained in the courthouse were destroyed.

In addition to the desecration of the courthouse's loose paper records, either a Union Army officer or an Indiana unit confiscated an old Scots language Bible belonging to White, which had been passed down to him from his grandfather, John White. The "old Scots Bible" was purportedly taken as punishment against White for his support of the Confederacy.

Removal to Richmond
White left Romney with his wife and youngest children and traveled to Richmond where he was offered a position in the Confederate States Department of the Treasury within the government of the President of the Confederate States of America, Jefferson Davis.

Death and legacy 
White died soon after his arrival in Richmond on October 9, 1862. He was interred by Scottish Rite Masons at Hollywood Cemetery in Richmond. Distant relative Reverend Moses D. Hoge of the Southern Presbyterian Church, Bishop Duncan of the Methodist Episcopal Church, South, and Bishop Minegerode of the Southern Protestant Episcopal Church participated in White's funeral services.

White's friends and family believed that he "died of grief" caused by the loss of his property in Romney and his concern for the safety of the records in the Hampshire County Courthouse during the conflict. In their History of Hampshire County, West Virginia: From Its Earliest Settlement to the Present (1897), West Virginia historians Hu Maxwell and Howard Llewellyn Swisher said of White:

Personal life

Marriage and issue
White was married first to Alcinda Louisa Tapscott of Jefferson County, Virginia (now West Virginia), on December 15, 1815. Tapscott was White's cousin through his mother, Arabella Baker White. White and his first wife Alcinda had three children together:

White was married for the second time to Frances Ann Streit (March 19, 1811 – November 12, 1866), a daughter of Lutheran Reverend Christian Streit of Winchester, Virginia. Streit and her family were of Swiss descent. White and his second wife, Frances, had ten children (one of which died in infancy):

Residence

White and his family resided in a large brick mansion located along East Main Street (Northwestern Turnpike) which was later known as "Liberty Hall". Due to his upbringing in an affluent family, White was a person of means from a young age, and in his early adulthood he was able to construct a "large brick mansion" at this location. His original residence was destroyed by fire in 1857, and White replaced it with a more modest brick edifice where he resided until his departure from Romney in 1861 during the American Civil War. White's home was a "seat of true old Virginia hospitality" and it was frequented by all socio-cultural strata of Hampshire County and the greater Valley of Virginia region.

During the construction of the Northwestern Turnpike through Romney, the state superintendent for the project, Angus William McDonald, proposed building the thoroughfare through White's garden in front of his residence. White won an appeal in court which caused the turnpike to be rerouted, thus creating the present curve on East Main Street in front of White's former residence.

References

Bibliography

External links
 
 

1794 births
1862 deaths
19th-century American lawyers
19th-century Presbyterians
United States Army personnel of the War of 1812
American corporate directors
American people of English descent
American people of Scottish descent
Burials at Hollywood Cemetery (Richmond, Virginia)
Confederate States Department of the Treasury officials
County clerks in Virginia
Hampshire County, West Virginia, in the American Civil War
Members of the Romney Literary Society
People from Frederick County, Virginia
Politicians from Richmond, Virginia
People from Romney, West Virginia
People from Virginia in the War of 1812
People of Virginia in the American Civil War
People of West Virginia in the American Civil War
Presbyterians from Virginia
Presbyterians from West Virginia
Robert White family of Virginia and West Virginia
Trustees of educational establishments
United States Army officers
Virginia Constitutional Unionists
Virginia lawyers